The Rowe House is a historic home located at Fredericksburg, Virginia. It was built in 1828, and is a two-story, four-bay, double-pile, side-passage-plan Federal style brick dwelling. It has an English basement, molded brick cornice, deep gable roof, and two-story front porch.  Attached to the house is a one-story,
brick, two-room addition, also with a raised basement, and a one-story, late 19th century frame wing. The interior features Greek Revival-style pattern mouldings. Also on the property is a garden storage building built in about 1950, that was designed to resemble a 19th-century smokehouse.

It was listed on the National Register of Historic Places in 2008.

References

Houses on the National Register of Historic Places in Virginia
Federal architecture in Virginia
Greek Revival houses in Virginia
Houses completed in 1859
Houses in Fredericksburg, Virginia
National Register of Historic Places in Fredericksburg, Virginia